Estonia competed at the 2011 Summer Universiade in Shenzhen, China.

Medalists

Cycling

Road
Men
Mihkel Ronimois
Rauno Miilmann

Football

Women
 Signy Aarna
 Kristel Eier
 Liis Emajõe
 Hannaliis Jaadla
 Imbi Hoop
 Miina Kallas
 Karina Kesvatera
 Getter Laar
 Daniela Mona Lambin
 Katrin Loo
 Maarija Mikiver
 Kethy Õunpuu
 Annika Pajupuu
 Cathy Pärnamets
 Pille Raadik
 Liisi Sakala
 Eneli Vals
 Margarita Zernosekova
 Inna Zlidnis

References

Nations at the 2011 Summer Universiade
2011 in Estonian sport
Estonia at the Summer Universiade